Katayevo is a rural locality (a village) in Vereshchaginsky District, Perm Krai, Russia. The population was 58 as of 2010.

Geography 
Katayevo is located 32 km west of Vereshchagino (the district's administrative centre) by road. Kalinichi is the nearest rural locality.

References 

Rural localities in Vereshchaginsky District